Ali Asgar (also Romanized as ʿAlī ʿAsgar; also known as Menār, Menār-e Saţorvand, and Monār) is a village in Kunani Rural District, Kunani District, Kuhdasht County, Lorestan Province, Iran. At the 2006 census, its population was 127, in 25 families.

References 

Towns and villages in Kuhdasht County